was an educator and an administrator, the schoolmaster of Kyoritsu Women's University, which was founded by her mother-in-law, Haruko Hatoyama. She is well known as the wife of Ichirō Hatoyama, who was the 52nd–54th Prime Minister of Japan, serving terms from December 10, 1954 through December 23, 1956. She was the mother of Iichirō Hatoyama, who was Japan's Foreign Minister from 1976 through 1977.

After the elections of 2009, she became more widely known as the grandmother of Prime Minister Yukio Hatoyama and his politician brother Kunio Hatoyama.

See also
Hatoyama Hall (Hatoyama Kaikan)

Notes

References
 Itoh, Mayumi (2003). The Hatoyama Dynasty: Japanese Political Leadership through the Generations. New York: Palgrave Macmillan. , . .

External links

Hatoyama Hall official website 

1888 births
1982 deaths
Kaoru
Spouses of prime ministers of Japan
Japanese educators
Recipients of the Order of the Sacred Treasure, 1st class
Japanese women educators